Gumbat, also known as Seni Gumbat, is a tehsil located in the Kohat District of Khyber Pakhtunkhwa, Pakistan. It is situated in a valley on both sides of the Kohat–Rawalpindi Road and is 25 km the district capital Kohat.

References

External links
 Gumbat

Kohat District